Kheyr Khujeh-ye Sofla (also Romanized as Kheyr Khūjeh-ye Soflá; also known as Kheyr Khūjeh-ye Pā’īn) is a village in Atrak Rural District, Dashli Borun District, Gonbad-e Qabus County, Golestan Province, Iran. At the 2006 census, its population was 218, in 48 families.

References 

Populated places in Gonbad-e Kavus County